Chintapalli is a major tourist and historic town and mandal in Alluri Sitharama Raju district in the Indian state of Andhra Pradesh.

Every year lakhs of tourists from all over the country come here during the winter season. The temperature in this area often falls down to below 8 degrees Celsius. Tourists come here to enjoy the cold winter nights and early morning dews. Daytime can be very warm. 

Chintapalli is also where the Rampa Rebellion, led by Alluri Sitarama Raju against the British in 1922 got started. Chintapalle Police Station was the first one to be attacked by the Revolutionaries during the freedom struggle.

Chintapalli is considered to be the headquarters of the agricultural and commercial crops market.

Geography
It has an average elevation of 839 meters (2755 feet). It is 132 km from Visakhapatnam and 19 km from  Andhra's "Kashmir", Lammasingi (Lambasingi). The highest point in Eastern Ghats is also in Chintapalli.

Tourist attractions 

There are many picturesque areas in and around Chintapalle. These areas include nationally recognised Lammasingi, Kothapalli waterfalls, Tajangi dam, Strawberry plantations, Regional Agricultural Research Station (RARS), apple plantations, orchid plantations, dragon fruit plantations and coffee plantations. All these places are within 15 km of the town. Tourists can get accommodations in government guesthouses or private cottages available for a very minimum fare.

Demographics

As of the 2011 census,  The town has a population of 7,888 of which 4,196 are males and 3,692 are females. Average Sex Ratio of the town is 880 against state average of 993. Population of Children with age of 0-6 is 632 which is 8.01% of total population of Chintapalle. Child Sex Ratio in the town is around 945 compared to Andhra Pradesh state average of 939. Literacy rate of Chintapalle town is 79.80% higher than state average of 67.02%.

Legislative assembly
Chintapalle is an assembly constituency in Andhra Pradesh until 2009. In the 2009 general elections the Chintapalle assembly constituency was merged into Paderu constituency.

Eminent persons
 Alluri Sitarama Raju - Freedom fighter, Revolutionist and the Leader of the Rampa Rebellion of 1922.
 Gam Malludora - Member of 1st Lok Sabha

Education
Chintapalli is a major educational destination for people living in nearby mandals. There are various educational institutions in Chintapalli from primary schools to graduate degree colleges, both public and private sector, administered by the School Education Department of the state. The medium of instruction followed by different schools are English and Telugu.

References 

Census Towns in Visakhapatnam district